Warren is a town in Bristol County, Rhode Island, United States. The population was 11,147 at the 2020 census.

History

Warren was the site of the Pokanoket Indian settlement of Sowams located on a peninsula within the Pokanoket region. The region consisted of over 60 settlements under the authority of Chief Massasoit (sometimes called Osamequin) who controlled the land from Plymouth to the eastern shores of Narragansett Bay. English colonists Edward Winslow and Stephen Hopkins from Plymouth Colony first visited there in July, 1621. Winslow and John Hampden saved Massasoit's life two years later and gained an important ally and lifelong friend. The colonists set up a trading post by 1632 on the banks of the Kickamuit River where they traded English goods for furs and other items. Roger Williams was banished from Salem, Massachusetts, in January, 1636, and fled to Sowams, becoming ill on the way. He was sheltered by Massasoit in Sowams until he recovered over the winter months; he later established Providence Plantations.

Permanent English settlement began east of the Indian village in 1653. Massasoit and his oldest son Wamsutta sold to Plymouth Colony settlers what is now Warren and parts of Barrington, Rhode Island, Swansea, Massachusetts, and Rehoboth, Massachusetts. The land was part of the Massachusetts Bay Colony and was first incorporated as part of Swansea. After the death of Massasoit, however, relations became strained between the Indians and the settlers, leading to King Philip's War in 1675 when the Indians destroyed the settlement at Sowams. In 1668, the township was officially incorporated with the name Sowams; in 1691, the Plymouth Colony merged with the Massachusetts Bay Colony.

Warren was ceded to Rhode Island from Massachusetts in 1747 along with the Attleborough Gore (now Cumberland), Barrington, Bristol, Tiverton, and Little Compton, Rhode Island. The town was named "Warren" after British naval hero Admiral Sir Peter Warren after a victory at Louisburg in 1745. Barrington was unified with Warren at the time, until it was separated again in 1770.

Warren was the original home of Brown University, founded in 1764 as the College in the English Colony of Rhode Island and Providence Plantations. The school registered its first students in 1765 and was the Baptist answer to Congregationalist Yale and Harvard, Presbyterian Princeton, and Episcopalian Penn and Columbia. It was the only one of these schools that welcomed students of all religious persuasions, following the example of Roger Williams, who founded Rhode Island in 1636 on the same principle.

In the mid-18th century, the town was well known as a whaling port, and ship building became an important industry. The Revolutionary War seriously affected Warren's commercial prosperity, and the town suffered British raids in 1778 along with the rest of the region. Commerce revived within the decade after the Revolution until the middle of the 19th century, and Warren was famous for the fine vessels launched from its yards. These vessels were largely commanded and operated by Warren crews, and they engaged in whaling, merchant service, and the West India trade. Three notable ships were built in Warren by Chase & Davis: the 1853 clipper Lookout, the 1853 clipper bark Gem of the Sea, and the 1854 clipper bark Mary Ogden.

With the decline of the whaling industry and related seafaring commerce toward the middle of the 19th century, business attention turned to textile manufacturing. Warren's first cotton mill was erected by the Warren Manufacturing Company in 1847. Further mills and factories developed during and after the Civil War, attracting an immigrant work force. Today, Warren is home to several waterfront businesses such as Blount Marine, Blount Seafood, and Dyer Boats.

Geography
Warren is located on the east bank of the Warren River (opposite Barrington, Rhode Island).

Demographics

As of the census of 2000, there were 11,360 people, 4,708 households, and 2,994 families residing in the town. The racial makeup of the town was 96.82% White, 0.83% African American, 0.23% Native American, 0.50% Asian, 0.04% Pacific Islander, 0.29% from other races, and 1.29% from two or more races. Hispanic or Latino of any race were 0.93% of the population.

There were 4,708 households, out of which 27.4% had children under the age of 18 living with them, 47.3% were married couples living together, 12.6% had a female householder with no husband present, and 36.4% were non-families. Of all households, 30.8% were made up of individuals, and 11.7% had someone living alone who was 65 years of age or older.  The average household size was 2.36 and the average family size was 2.96.

In the town, the population was spread out, with 21.6% under the age of 18, 7.6% from 18 to 24, 30.0% from 25 to 44, 23.0% from 45 to 64, and 17.9% who were 65 years of age or older.  The median age was 40 years. For every 100 females, there were 90.4 males.  For every 100 females age 18 and over, there were 86.0 males.

The median income for a household in the town was $41,285, and the median income for a family was $52,824. Males had a median income of $35,472 versus $27,023 for females. The per capita income for the town was $22,448.  About 5.2% of families and 7.3% of the population were below the poverty line, including 8.1% of those under age 18 and 10.4% of those age 65 or over.

Government

Warren is a part of the 10th District in the Rhode Island Senate and is currently represented by Democrat Walter Felag Jr. The town is a part of Rhode Island's 1st congressional district at the federal level and is presently represented by Democrat David Cicilline. It is a reliably Democratic stronghold in presidential elections, as no Republican has carried the town in over four decades.

Notable places
 East Bay Bike Path
 Warren United Methodist Church and Parsonage
 Warren Waterfront Historic District

Notable people

 Lou Abbruzzi, NFL football player
 Pat Abbruzzi, All-Star Canadian football player, RI football legend
 F. Nelson Blount, founder of the Blount Seafood Corporation and steam locomotive collector
 Luther Blount, started Blount Marine, American Canadian Caribbean Cruise Lines and Bay Queen Cruises
 Hezekiah Butterworth, an American writer of books for young people, and a poet
 Jo-Jo Morrissey, infielder for the Cincinnati Reds and Chicago White Sox
 Elizabeth "Lizzie" Murphy, "The Queen of Baseball"—the first woman to play professional baseball competing with male athletes

See also

References

 RI Preservation Survey – Warren

External links

 Town Web Page
 Discover Warren
 Town of Warren Official GIS Maps and Property Information
 George Hail Free Library—the town library

 
1668 establishments in Rhode Island
Providence metropolitan area
Towns in Bristol County, Rhode Island
Towns in Rhode Island